Peter Muckenhuber (born 16 February 1955) is an Austrian former cyclist. He competed at the 1980 Summer Olympics and the 1984 Summer Olympics. He won the Austrian National Road Race Championships in 1980 and 1982.

References

External links
 

1955 births
Living people
Austrian male cyclists
Olympic cyclists of Austria
Cyclists at the 1980 Summer Olympics
Cyclists at the 1984 Summer Olympics
Sportspeople from Salzburg
20th-century Austrian people